Sayn-Wittgenstein-Vallendar was a County of the Holy Roman Empire in Germany. It was created as a partition of Sayn-Wittgenstein-Wittgenstein, and was inherited by Sayn-Wittgenstein-Hohenstein in 1775.

Counts of Sayn-Wittgenstein-Vallendar (1657–1775) 
 Friedrich Wilhelm (1657–1685|85)
 Johann Friedrich (1685–1718)
 Franz Friedrich Hugo (1718–1769)
 Johann Wilhelm (1718–1775)

1657 establishments in the Holy Roman Empire